The River Erewash  is a river in England, a tributary of the River Trent that flows roughly southwards through Derbyshire, close to its eastern border with Nottinghamshire.

Etymology 
The approximate meaning of the name is not in doubt, but there is room for debate about the precise derivation and its connotations. This is accepted by Kenneth Cameron, a leading placename expert and Derbyshire specialist, who interprets the name as "wandering, marshy river". Gelling, who specialises in seeking precise topographical equivalents for toponymic elements, confirms that  signifies a marshy meadow but gives only southern examples. She conjectures that there is an element, wæsse, perhaps Old English, that signifies very specifically "land by a meandering river which floods and drains quickly", and her examples are primarily Midland and northern. This seems to fit the Erewash perfectly. A good example of the meandering character of the river will be seen around Gallows Inn Playing Fields, Ilkeston, where rapid flooding and draining occur frequently. As it meanders through Toton and Long Eaton the river splits into two sections; the main course veers to the east and the relief channel flows over a low weir in a straight southerly direction. When there has been prolonged rainfall, the two waters are prone to bursting their banks and meet over the football pitches and the cricket pitch.

Course 

The Erewash rises in Kirkby-in-Ashfield, Nottinghamshire, but is partly culverted as it flows south-westward from the town. It surfaces definitively to the north of Kirkby Woodhouse and flows roughly westward, under the M1 motorway, and between Pinxton and Selston. It then becomes the approximate county boundary between Nottinghamshire and Derbyshire, flowing roughly south, between Langley Mill and Eastwood, skirting the east of Ilkeston, where it becomes also the boundary of the Borough of Erewash. The river continues south between Sandiacre and Stapleford until, at Toton, it turns east and flows into the River Trent, at the Attenborough Nature Reserve, near Long Eaton.

It gives its name to the Erewash Valley, which has a rich industrial history, and the local government district and borough of Erewash, which was named after the river when the former borough of Ilkeston and urban district of Long Eaton were united with some of the surrounding rural areas in 1974.

Although the river is not navigable at any part, it runs parallel to the Erewash Canal for much of its length (from Langley Mill to the River Trent); north of Langley Mill, it was paralleled by the abandoned Cromford Canal (from the branch to Pinxton).

Literary associations 

For such a small river the Erewash has a surprisingly high literary profile, owing almost entirely to D.H. Lawrence, who mentions it several times and centres a number of works in the Erewash valley. A reference at the beginning of The Rainbow is perhaps the most telling from the geographical point of view:

See also 
 List of rivers in England

References 
Citations

Bibliography

Rivers of Derbyshire
Rivers of Nottinghamshire
1Erewash
Tributaries of the River Trent